Guy Thomas (born 30 August 1977) is a New Zealand equestrian. His speciality is show jumping, either individually or as part of a team.

Personal life 
Guy Thomas was born 30 August 1977 in Burson, California, the son of Graeme "Butch" Thomas and Lu Thomas, both former international riders.

Guy Thomas grew up in a riding family.  His parents, Graeme "Butch" and Lu Thomas, are highly successful riders and trainers, both having competed in the FEI World Cup Finals.  Guy was a natural rider from the time he started riding at the age of two and a half.  During his upbringing, rather than exerting pressure to join the family business, his parents pledged their support for whatever life path Guy ultimately chose to pursue.

Career 
Guy Thomas competed at the 2004 Summer Olympics in Athens, Greece for the New Zealand Olympic team and also rode for the New Zealand Team at the 2010 World Equestrian Games in Lexington, KY. He qualified for and competed in the 2008 Rolex FEI World Cup™ Jumping Finals in Gothenburg, Sweden.

Career Grand Prix Highlights 
 2013
1st Place, Menlo Grand Prix, Menlo Charity Horse Show in Atherton, CA with Peterbilt
1st Place, Golden State Horse Show Grand Prix in Sacramento, CA with Peterbilt
1st Place, HMI Equestrian Challenge Grand Prix in Sonoma, CA with Peterbilt
 2012
1st Place, Menlo Grand Prix, Menlo Charity Horse Show in Atherton, CA with Peterbilt
 2011
1st Place, Pebble Beach Equestrian Classic III Grand Prix in Pebble Beach, CA with Lavito
2nd Place, Pebble Beach Equestrian Classic III Grand Prix in Pebble Beach, CA with Acomulado
1st Place, Pebble Beach Equestrian Classic II Grand Prix in Pebble Beach, CA with Lavito
 2010
1st Place, Cargill Cup, Spruce Meadows Canada One in Calgary, Alberta, Canada with Peterbilt
1st Place, Pickwick Summer Classic Grand Prix in Sacramento, CA with Peterbilt
1st Place, Golden State Horse Show Grand Prix in Sacramento, CA with Peterbilt
2nd Place, Golden State Horse Show Grand Prix in Sacramento, CA with Carino
1st Place, Capital City Classic Horse Show Grand Prix in Sacramento, CA with Peterbilt
2nd Place, Capital City Classic Horse Show Grand Prix in Sacramento, CA with Carino
2nd Place, HITS Thermal $300k Lamborghini Grand Prix of the Desert in Thermal, CA with Peterbilt
1st Place, HITS Thermal Grand Prix in Thermal, CA with Carino
1st Place, HITS Thermal Purnia Mills Grand Prix in Thermal, CA with Peterbilt
 2009
1st Place, Pickwick Summer Classic Grand Prix in Sacramento, CA with Peterbilt
1st Place, Showpark Jumper Classic Grand Prix in Del Mar, CA with Peterbilt

Horses

References 

Equestrians at the 2004 Summer Olympics
New Zealand male equestrians
1977 births
Olympic equestrians of New Zealand
Living people